La Serre is a commune in the Aveyron department in southern France.

Population

The GSSP Golden Spike for the Tournaisian is in La Serre, with the first appearance of the conodont Siphonodella sulcata. In 2006 it was discovered that this GSSP has biostratigraphic problems.

See also
Communes of the Aveyron department

References

Communes of Aveyron
Aveyron communes articles needing translation from French Wikipedia